Miliduch (also Miliduh and , , ; d. 806) was a knyaz of the Sorbs. Formerly allied to Charlemagne, the Sorbs ended their vassalage to the Franks and rebelled, invading Austrasia. Charles the Younger launched a campaign against the Slavs in Bohemia in 805, and after killing Duke Lecho of the Bohemians, Charles himself crossed the Saale with his army and killed Miliduch and knyaz Nussito (Nessyta), near modern-day Weißenfels, in 806. The region was laid to waste, upon which the other Slavic chieftains submitted and gave hostages.

References 

806 deaths
Early Sorbian people
9th-century rulers in Europe
9th-century Slavs
Year of birth unknown
Slavic warriors